Aleksi is a masculine Finnish given name. Notable people with the name include:

Aleksi Bardy 
Aleksi Benashvili 
Aleksi Eeben
Aleksi Elorinne 
Aleksi Hihnavaara 
Aleksi Holmberg 
Aleksi Laakso
Alexi Laiho
Aleksi Lehtonen 
Aleksi Mäkelä (disambiguation), several people
Aleksi Mustonen 
Aleksi Orenius 
Aleksi Paananen 
Aleksi Randell 
Aleksi Ristola 
Aleksi Rutanen 
Aleksi Saarela 
Aleksi Sariola 
Aleksi Sihvonen

See also
 Aleksy
 Alexy
 Alexey
 Alexie

Finnish masculine given names